Oak Vale is an unincorporated community in Jefferson Davis and Lawrence counties, Mississippi, United States. Its ZIP code is 39656. Oak Vale is located on the former Illinois Central Railroad and was once home to a bank and general store. A post office operated under the name Oakvale from 1856 to 1869 and began operating under the name Oak Vale in 1873.

Oak Vale is referenced in the title of Natasha Trethewey's poem Signs, Oakvale, Mississippi, 1941.

Notes

Unincorporated communities in Jefferson Davis County, Mississippi
Unincorporated communities in Lawrence County, Mississippi
Unincorporated communities in Mississippi